Fartuun Abdisalaan Adan is a Somali social activist. She is the Executive Director of the Elman Peace and Human Rights Centre.

Personal life
Adan grew up in Somalia. She was married to Elman Ali Ahmed, a local entrepreneur and peace activist. The couple had four daughters.

In 1996, during the height of the civil war, Adan's husband was killed near the family's home in southern Mogadishu. Adan subsequently emigrated to Canada in 1999.

In 2007, she returned to Somalia to advocate for peace and human rights.

On November 20, 2019, local authorities confirmed her daughter Almaas Elman, who had also returned to Somalia as an aid worker, had been shot and killed in a car, near the Mogadishu airport.

Career
Adan is the Executive Director of the Elman Peace and Human Rights Centre, a Mogadishu-based NGO established in honour of her late husband. She serves as the organization's Executive Director, while their daughter Ilwad works alongside her.

Through the center, she also co-founded Sister Somalia, the country's first program for assistance of victims of sexual violence.

Awards
In 2013, Adan was presented an International Women of Courage Award from the United States Department of State.

In 2014, she also received an award from the government of Germany for her work with the Elman Peace and Human Rights Centre.

Fartuun Adan, together with her daughter Ilwad Elman was among the finalists nominated for the Aurora Prize for Awakening Humanity in 2017.

References

External links
Sister Somalia

Living people
Ethnic Somali people
Somalian activists
Somalian women activists
Year of birth missing (living people)
Women human rights activists
Recipients of the International Women of Courage Award